Duck à l'orange, orange duck, or canard à l'orange is a French dish in cuisine bourgeoise consisting of a roast duck with a bigarade sauce.

Another dish called canard à l'orange is braised rather than roasted. In that case, it is cooked until spoon-tender.

Variations
Duck à l'orange is an English interpretation of the French dish, made popular in the UK and US in the 1960s.

Vit Nau Cam is a Vietnamese interpretation of the dish, with additional spices and aromatics.

In popular culture
The 1975 Italian comedy film Duck in Orange Sauce was named after the dish.

See also
 List of duck dishes

References

Duck dishes
French cuisine
Citrus dishes
Food combinations